Mag-Asawa'y Di Biro (English: Marriage Is Not A Joke) is a situational comedy television show in the Philippines which aired on RPN (New Vision 9) from 1990 to 1993. It starred Ramon Christopher and Lotlot de Leon as the show's marriage couple, along with Pilita Corrales and Eddie Gutierrez as the in-laws. The show also had Flora Gasser, Dennis Padilla and Katrina Sanzenni.

Cast
Pilita Corrales as Divina
Eddie Gutierrez as Ulysses
Ramon Christopher as Sam
Lotlot de Leon as Chari
Flora Gasser as Deborah
Dennis Padilla as Apollo
Katrina Sanzenni as Janine

See also
List of Philippine television shows
List of programs previously broadcast by Radio Philippines Network

Philippine comedy television series
1990 Philippine television series debuts
1993 Philippine television series endings
Radio Philippines Network original programming